Jon Landau (born May 14, 1947) is an American music critic, manager, and record producer.  He has worked with Bruce Springsteen in all three capacities. He is the head of the nominating committee for the Rock and Roll Hall of Fame, and received that institution's Ahmet Ertegun Award for Lifetime Achievement in 2020.

Early life
Born in New York City, Landau grew up in Bensonhurst, Brooklyn and then in Queens before his family moved to the Boston suburb of Lexington, Massachusetts when he was 12.  He attended Lexington High School and then Brandeis University, where he earned a degree in history with honors. 

Aligning himself with the growing underground culture of late-1960s Boston, Landau carved out a niche while writing for the music magazine Crawdaddy. A failed performer yet a passionate, devoted fan, Landau championed the straightforward rock and roll that he loved, and wrote scathing reviews of what he saw as the overblown, pretentious San Francisco scene.

As a critic, Landau wrote for Rolling Stone from its first issue and for other publications. In Volume 1, Number 1 of Rolling Stone, published on November 9, 1967, Landau compared Jimi Hendrix and his debut album, Are You Experienced, to Eric Clapton and Cream's debut album, Fresh Cream (both released months before, and both Hendrix and Cream having made huge American splashes as live performers that summer). The next few issues saw Landau staking out more traditional R&B and soul territory with profiles of Aretha Franklin, and Sam and Dave, plus a posthumous Otis Redding appreciation.

Bruce Springsteen connection
Landau's 1974 article in The Real Paper, wherein he claimed, "I saw rock and roll's future and its name is Bruce Springsteen!," is credited by Nick Hornby and others with fostering Springsteen's popularity. Landau was then hired by Springsteen, and is cited as co-producer on Springsteen studio records from 1975's Born to Run through 1992's Human Touch and Lucky Town. Landau is considered to have influenced Springsteen artistically as well as professionally.

Other music projects
Other artists that Landau has managed or produced include MC5, Livingston Taylor, Jackson Browne, Natalie Merchant, Alejandro Escovedo, Train, and Shania Twain.

Landau has been responsible for the liner notes for The Atlantic Albums Collection by Aretha Franklin (2015), Soul Manifesto: 1964-1970 by Otis Redding (2015), and The Complete Atlantic Albums Collection by Wilson Pickett (2017).

Personal life
Landau was once married to The New York Times film critic (and later book reviewer) Janet Maslin. He later married Barbara Downey, a former Rolling Stone editor. They have two children, Kate, also an artist manager, and Charles.  Landau and his wife own an art collection that includes work by Titian, Tintoretto, Tiepolo, Donatello, Ghiberti, Géricault, Delacroix, and Corot. He also owns one of the largest private collections of Courbet. With the exception of his family and his work, the collection, featuring Italian painting and sculpture of the 13th through 17th centuries and mid-19th-century French romantic realist painting, is reportedly Jon’s greatest interest in life. 

In 2011, Landau had a growth in his brain surgically removed. The surgery resulted in the loss of sight in one eye.

References

External links 
All Music.com Profile
Blog on Huffington Post

1947 births
Living people
American music critics
American music managers
Record producers from New York (state)
Record producers from Massachusetts
Brandeis University alumni
Bruce Springsteen
People from Bensonhurst, Brooklyn
People from Lexington, Massachusetts
Rock critics
Rolling Stone people